Meldal is a municipality in Trøndelag county, Norway.

Meldal may also refer to:

People
Justin Meldal-Johnsen (born 1970), an American producer, songwriter, bassist, multi-instrumentalist and musical director
Morten P. Meldal (born 1954), a Danish chemist and professor of Chemistry at the University of Copenhagen

Places

Canada
Meldal Subdivision, Alberta, a village area in Camrose county in the province of Alberta

Norway
Meldal (village), a village in the municipality of Meldal in Trøndelag county
Meldal Church, a church in the municipality of Meldal in Trøndelag county

Other
Meldal dialect, a dialect of Norwegian used in Meldal municipality; it is a variety of Trøndersk

See also
Meldale, Queensland